K-84 refers to

 Russian submarine K-84 Ekaterinburg
 K-84 trailer
 K-84 Commuter
 British corvette HMS Hyacinth (K84)
 K-84 (Kansas highway)